Charles Champlain Townsend (November 24, 1841 – July 10, 1910) was a Republican member of the U.S. House of Representatives from Pennsylvania.

Biography
Charles C. Townsend was born in Allegheny, Pennsylvania (now a part of Pittsburgh). He attended the common schools and then the University of Pittsburgh (then known as the Western University of Pennsylvania) in Pittsburgh.

He worked as a manufacturer of wire rivets and nails. During the American Civil War, he served two years in the Union Army as a private in Company A, Ninth Regiment, Pennsylvania Volunteer Reserve Corps, and later as adjutant of the First Pennsylvania Volunteer Cavalry. 

Townsend was elected as a Republican to the Fifty-first Congress. He was not a candidate for renomination in 1890, but resumed his work in manufacturing.

Death and interment
Townsend died in New Brighton, Pennsylvania in 1910, and was interred in the Grove Cemetery.

References

Politicians from Pittsburgh
University of Pittsburgh alumni
Union Army soldiers
1841 births
1910 deaths
Republican Party members of the United States House of Representatives from Pennsylvania
19th-century American politicians